The 1902 Svenska Mästerskapet was the seventh season of Svenska Mästerskapet, the football Cup to determine the Swedish champions. Örgryte IS won the tournament by defeating Jönköpings AIF in the final with an 8–0 score.

Final

References 

Print

1902
Svenska
Mas